The 1980–81 NBA season was the 35th season of the National Basketball Association. The season ended with the Boston Celtics winning the NBA Championship, beating the Houston Rockets 4 games to 2 in the NBA Finals.  As of 2022, this was the last time an NBA season (including postseason) had ended before Memorial Day.

Notable occurrences

The Dallas Mavericks become the league's 23rd franchise. As a result, the NBA realigns four of its teams to better reflect their geographical locations (the Milwaukee Bucks and Chicago Bulls move to the Eastern Conference and the San Antonio Spurs and Houston Rockets to the Western Conference), finishing a process of geographic realignment that began in the 1978–79 season.
The 1981 NBA All-Star Game was played at the Richfield Coliseum near Cleveland, Ohio, with the East defeating the West 123–120. Nate Archibald of the Boston Celtics wins the game's MVP award.
To date, this was the final time that a regular-season had ended during the month of March.
The Houston Rockets (40–42) become just the second team in NBA history (to date) to make the finals without posting a winning record during the regular season. The Kansas City Kings, their opponents in the Western Conference Finals, also posted a 40–42 record.
It was the final season for Hall of Famers Rudy Tomjanovich, Wes Unseld, and Jo Jo White.

Final standings

By division

By conference

Notes
z – Clinched home court advantage for the entire playoffs and first round bye
c – Clinched home court advantage for the conference playoffs and first round bye
y – Clinched division title and first round bye
x – Clinched playoff spot

Playoffs
Teams in bold advanced to the next round. The numbers to the left of each team indicate the team's seeding in its conference, and the numbers to the right indicate the number of games the team won in that round. The division champions are marked by an asterisk. Home court advantage does not necessarily belong to the higher-seeded team, but instead the team with the better regular season record; teams enjoying the home advantage are shown in italics. Note that in the Western Conference, the lower seeded team won every series.

Statistics leaders

NBA awards
Most Valuable Player: Julius Erving, Philadelphia 76ers
Rookie of the Year: Darrell Griffith, Utah Jazz
Coach of the Year: Jack McKinney, Indiana Pacers

All-NBA First Team:
F – Larry Bird, Boston Celtics
F – Julius Erving, Philadelphia 76ers
C – Kareem Abdul-Jabbar, Los Angeles Lakers
G – Dennis Johnson, Phoenix Suns
G – George Gervin, San Antonio Spurs

All-NBA Second Team:
F – Marques Johnson, Milwaukee Bucks
F – Adrian Dantley, Utah Jazz
C – Moses Malone, Houston Rockets
G – Otis Birdsong, Kansas City Kings
G – Nate Archibald, Boston Celtics

All-NBA Rookie Team:
Kelvin Ransey, Portland Trail Blazers
Darrell Griffith, Utah Jazz
Larry Smith, Golden State Warriors
Kevin McHale, Boston Celtics
Joe Barry Carroll, Golden State Warriors

NBA All-Defensive First Team:
Bobby Jones, Philadelphia 76ers
Caldwell Jones, Philadelphia 76ers
Kareem Abdul-Jabbar, Los Angeles Lakers
Dennis Johnson, Phoenix Suns
Micheal Ray Richardson, New York Knicks

NBA All-Defensive Second Team:
Dan Roundfield, Atlanta Hawks
Kermit Washington, Portland Trail Blazers
George Johnson, San Antonio Spurs
Quinn Buckner, Milwaukee Bucks
Dudley Bradley, Indiana Pacers (tie)
Michael Cooper, Los Angeles Lakers (tie)

Players of the week

Players of the month

Notes

 Inducted into the Hall of Fame as a coach.

References

 
NBA